The Battle of Gettysburg half dollar was designed by Frank Vittor and minted in 1937, although it was dated 1936. It commemorated the upcoming 1938 75th anniversary of the 1863 Battle of Gettysburg.

Description
Two United States Civil War veterans, one from the Union camp and one from the Confederate camp, are featured on the obverse of the coin. E pluribus unum ("Out of Many, One"), the de facto United States national motto until 1956, is displayed prominently above the two war veterans, with the "E" serving as both the first letter of the motto and the middle letter of Liberty.

The Battle of Gettysburg 

The Battle of Gettysburg was fought July 1–3, 1863, in and around the town of Gettysburg, Pennsylvania, by Union and Confederate forces during the American Civil War. The battle involved the largest number of casualties of the entire war and is often described as the war's turning point. Union Maj. Gen. George Meade's Army of the Potomac defeated attacks by Confederate Gen. Robert E. Lee's Army of Northern Virginia, halting Lee's invasion of the North.  The battle took place over three days and took the lives of 23,000–28,000 (estimated) Confederates and 23,049 Union soldiers

See also
 List of United States commemorative coins and medals (1930s)

References

External links
 

1937 establishments in the United States
Half dollar
Currencies introduced in 1937
Early United States commemorative coins
Fifty-cent coins
Aftermath of the American Civil War